Carsten Ball and Chris Guccione successfully defended their 2010 title, defeating John Paul Fruttero and Raven Klaasen in the final, 7–6(7–5), 6–4.

Seeds

Draw

Draw

References
 Main Draw

Comerica Bank Challenger - Doubles
Nordic Naturals Challenger